This is a list of transfers in Serbian football for the 2009–10 winter transfer window.
Only moves featuring a Serbian Superliga side are listed.

Serbian SuperLiga

Red Star Belgrade

In:

Out:

Partizan Belgrade

In:

Out:

FK Vojvodina

In:

Out:

OFK Belgrade

In:

Out:

Spartak Zlatibor Voda

In:

Out:

FK Jagodina

In:

Out:

FK Javor

In:

Out:

FK Smederevo

In:

 

Out:

Borac Čačak

In:

Out:

Hajduk Kula

In:

Out:

FK Napredak Kruševac

In:

Out:

Mladi Radnik

In:

Out:

Rad Belgrade

In:

Out:

BSK Borča

In:

Out:

FK Metalac G.M.

In:

Out:

Čukarički Stankom

In:

Out:

See also
Serbian SuperLiga
Serbian Superliga 2009-10
List of Serbian football transfers summer 2009

References
SuperLiga Transfers at MojSport.net.
Football news at B92 news agency. 
Football naws at Sportske.net. 
Football news at Sportal.rs. 

2009-10
Serbian SuperLiga
transfers